Hominy is dried mixed kernels, part of the Native American cuisine. 

Hominy may also refer to:
Hominy, Oklahoma, a city
Hominy Indians, a former professional football team from the above city
Hominy Falls, West Virginia, an unincorporated community
Hominy Hill Golf Course, a public golf course in Colts Neck, New Jersey